Neelavar (variously Neelavara or Nilavara) is a village in Brahmavar taluk of Udupi district in Karnataka, India. Neelavar is situated about 7 km from Brahmavar that lies on NH-17 and around 3 km from Kunjal that lies on the road from Brahmavar to Hebri. Neelavar lies roughly between the river Sita in the north and the village Kunjal to the south.

External links
 Neelavara link in the press Nilavara
 Shri Mahishamardini Temple official website 
 Details about Goshale 
 Details about Neelavara Dam 
 Map of Bavali Kudru in WikiMap 

Villages in Udupi district